The German Sportspersonality of the Year has been chosen annually since 1947, with separate awards made for men and women. The record holder is tennis player Steffi Graf, who won five awards. Swimmer Michael Groß, tennis player Boris Becker, and high jumper Ulrike Meyfarth each have four awards. Since 1957 the sport journalists also vote for Germany's Sportsteam of the Year.

In East Germany (GDR) there was also an annual vote for the Best Sportsman and Sportswoman of the Year, from 1953 to 1989, chosen by the readers of the daily newspaper Junge Welt. Since 1990, after reunification, the East and West German awards merged into one single award.

West Germany and Germany

East Germany

See also
German Footballer of the Year
German Volleyball Player of the Year
German Sports Badge

 
Sportspersonality of the Year
National sportsperson-of-the-year trophies and awards
Awards established in 1947
1947 establishments in Germany